Jimmy James (dob unknown - 24 December 1945 in Barmera)  was an Aboriginal Australian who was best known as an Aboriginal tracker who helped the police track criminals and lost persons.

Background
During the 1920s, Jimmy James was a police tracker. He then left to live in his resort, Swan Reach. He helped the police in the Monash murder of 1938. He also found a little girl who had been lost for days in the Walkerie district.

His last tracking was to find Mr Breeze who got lost in the Renmark surroundings, during which he caught a tuberculosis. He died in the Lady Weigall hospital in Barmera on 24 December 1945. He was buried in the Barmera Cemetery on 25 December 1945.

In the words of the Sergeant Ward of Barmera, Jimmy James was a "black man with a white heart".

Family
One of his unofficially adopted daughters, Lilian Disher, married another tracker named Jimmy James in 1947.

References

1945 deaths
Crime in South Australia
20th-century deaths from tuberculosis
Tuberculosis deaths in Australia
Infectious disease deaths in South Australia
Australian Aboriginal trackers